Gaer Fawr is an Iron Age hill fort located near Llanilar,  Ceredigion, Wales; the Ordnance Survey grid reference is SN648718.

The fort is registered with Cadw under reference number CD050. There are approximately 300 of these forts on the Cadw list, although archaeologists note that there are about 570 of them in Wales.

See also 
 List of hill forts in Wales
 Stone circle

References 

Hillforts in Ceredigion